Collisions, is the fourth album from New York-based Calla.

Track listing
 "It Dawned on Me" – 3:13
 "Initiate" – 3:30
 "This Better Go as Planned" – 3:58
 "Play Dead" – 3:33
 "Pulvarized" – 4:58
 "So Far, So What" – 4:21
 "Stumble" – 3:52
 "Imbusteros" – 1:23
 "Testify" – 3:45
 "Swagger" – 3:38
 "Overshadowed" – 5:11

References

2005 albums
Calla (band) albums
Beggars Banquet Records albums